Sir Thomas Anthony Cunningham   (born 16 September 1952) is a British politician who served as Member of Parliament (MP) for Workington from 2001 to 2015. A member of the Labour Party, he was Member of the European Parliament (MEP) for Cumbria and Lancashire North from 1994 to 1999.

Cunningham served in junior posts in the Blair and Brown governments from 2004 to 2010, and on Ed Miliband's opposition front bench from 2011 to 2013. Prior to his election to the European Parliament, he was Leader of Allerdale District Council from 1992 to 1994.

Early life

Tony Cunningham was born in Workington and educated at the Workington Grammar School (which became Stainburn School in 1984) on Stainburn Road before attending the University of Liverpool where he received a BA degree in History and Politics in 1975, and the Didsbury College of Education, Manchester where he qualified as a teacher with a Postgraduate Certificate in Education in 1976. 

He began his teaching career at the Alsager Comprehensive School on Hassall Road in 1976 until 1980 when he taught at the Mikunguni Trade School in Zanzibar. He returned to Britain in 1983 to teach history at Netherhall School, Maryport on Netherhall Road in Maryport and he remained in post until his election to the European Parliament. For the duration of his teaching career he was a member of the National Union of Teachers, serving as a local secretary 1985–1994, and has been a member of the Amalgamated Engineering and Electrical Union since 1993.

Political career

Local government 
He was elected a councillor to the Allerdale District Council in 1987, and became the leader of the council in 1992, he stepped down from both the leadership and the council in 1994. He was the Mayor of Workington in 1990.

European Parliament 
At the 1994 European Parliament election he became the MEP for Cumbria and Lancashire North, but was defeated in 1999. 

On leaving Strasbourg and Brussels in 1999 he became the Chief Executive of Human Rights NGO INDICT where he remained until his election to the House of Commons.

UK Parliament 
At the 2001 general election, Cunningham was elected as Member of Parliament for Workington, succeeding Dale Campbell-Savours in the safe Labour seat. He made his maiden speech on 13 July 2001.

Cunningham was a member of the European Scrutiny Select Committee from 2001 until 2004, when he was appointed Parliamentary Private Secretary to DEFRA Minister Elliot Morley. He was promoted to an Assistant Whip after the 2005 general election, and served as a Lord Commissioner of the Treasury from the 2008 government reshuffle until Labour's election defeat in 2010.

He was knighted in the 2012 Birthday Honours for public and political service. 

In 2012, opposition leader Ed Miliband appointed him to the front bench as a Shadow International Development Minister. He was removed from his role in the October 2013 reshuffle, and served on the International Development Select Committee from 2013 to 2015.

He was one of the few Labour MPs to vote against the Marriage (Same Sex Couples) Bill in 2013.

In June 2014, Cunningham announced that he would not be standing again at the next election.

Personal life

Cunningham has been married to Anne Margaret Gilmore since 1984; he has a stepson, a stepdaughter, and a son and a daughter with his wife. 

He is a deputy lieutenant of Cumbria, and has been a patron of both the Voluntary Service Overseas and Mines Advisory Group.

Cunningham is active in sports, he is a qualified rugby union coach and referee, and has played cricket and football, as well as rugby (both league and union) competitively. He played for the parliamentary football team, and he speaks some Swahili.

References

External links
 Profile at the Labour Party

1952 births
Living people
UK MPs 2001–2005
UK MPs 2005–2010
Alumni of the University of Liverpool
Alumni of Manchester Metropolitan University
Deputy Lieutenants of Cumbria
English Roman Catholics
Schoolteachers from Cumbria
Cumbria MPs
Knights Bachelor
Labour Party (UK) MEPs
Labour Party (UK) MPs for English constituencies
Mayors of places in Cumbria
MEPs for England 1994–1999
People from Workington
Politicians awarded knighthoods
Politics of Allerdale
UK MPs 2010–2015